The 1980–81 Penn Quakers men's basketball team represented the University of Pennsylvania during the 1980–81 NCAA Division I men's basketball season. The Quakers, coached by Bob Weinhauer, played in the Ivy League and had a 20-8 win–loss record.

Schedule

|-
!colspan=9 style=| Ivy League tournament

|-
!colspan=9 style=|National Invitation Tournament

References 

Penn Quakers men's basketball seasons
1980–81 Ivy League men's basketball season
1981 National Invitation Tournament participants
1980 in sports in Pennsylvania
1981 in sports in Pennsylvania